Dalia Mostafa (born on 12 April 1976) is an Egyptian actress and model. Mostafa is married to Egyptian actor Sherif Salama. She began her career as a TV advertisement model and started acting in 1995. As a model, Mostafa faced backlash for posting a photo in a bathing suit, prompting public conversations about the treatment of Arab women in Egypt.

Works

TV series

Radio series

Movies

Stage

References

External links
 Dalia Mostafa in IMDb

1976 births
Living people
Actresses from Cairo
Egyptian television actresses
Egyptian stage actresses
Egyptian film actresses
Egyptian Muslims